Albert Broadhouse (17 November 1893 – 1946) was an English footballer.

Career
Broadhouse joined Port Vale in the autumn of 1916, with World War I still raging. He played in the war league side until his conscription. He returned safely in March 1919 and played his first Football League matches, until losing his place in October and being released at the end of the 1919–20 season. The step up in quality possibly proved too much for him, as only four of his 26 games at The Old Recreation Ground came in the Second Division.

Career statistics
Source:

References

1893 births
1946 deaths
Sportspeople from Hanley, Staffordshire
English footballers
Association football wingers
Port Vale F.C. players
English Football League players
British Army personnel of World War I